In topological graph theory, the Wilson operations are a group of six transformations on graph embeddings. They are generated by two involutions on embeddings, surface duality and Petrie duality, and have the group structure of the symmetric group on three elements.

The operations are: identity, duality, Petrie duality, Petrie dual of dual, dual of Petrie dual, and dual of Petrie dual of dual or equivalently Petrie dual of dual of Petrie dual. Together they constitute the group S3.

These operations be characterized algebraically as the only outer automorphisms of certain group-theoretic representations of embedded graphs.
Via their action on dessins d'enfants, they can be used to study the absolute Galois group of the rational numbers.

One can also define corresponding operations on the edges of an embedded graph, the partial dual and partial Petrie dual, such that performing the same operation on all edges simultaneously is equivalent to taking the surface dual or Petrie dual. These operations generate a larger group, the ribbon group, acting on the embedded graphs.

References

Topological graph theory